The Vicentine Alps (Vicentiner Alpen or Vizentiner Voralpen) are a mountain range of the Eastern Alps in Trentino and the provinces of Verona and Vicenza. The mountains were named after the city of Vicenza which lies at their eastern edge. The highest point in the range is the 
Cima Dodici on the northern perimeter of the Vicentine Alps.

Boundaries 
The Alpine Club classification of the Eastern Alps (AVE) bounds the Vicentine Alps as follows:
In the west the Adige marks the boundary of the range from Verona to Trento. Further east, the Mocheni Valley forms the boundary, followed by the Sugana Valley (Brenta) to Bassano del Grappa and the North Italian Plain, from where Verona is reached.

Neighbouring ranges are: to the west, the Garda Mountains; to the north, the Fiemme Alps; and, to the east, the Dolomites.

Notable peaks 
 Cima Dodici (2,336 m)
 Cima Portule (2,310 m)
 Cima Carega (2,259 m)
 Cima Palon (2,232 m)
 Cima Posta (2,215 m)
 Cima del Cherlòng (2,210 m)
 Becco di Filadonna (2,150 m)
 Cima Mosca (2,141 m)
 Monte Ortigara (2,105 m)
 Monte Forni Alti (2,027 m)
 Monte Verena (2,015 m)
 Monte Plische, (Gruppo della Carega) (1,991 m)
 Monte Zevola, (Catena delle Tre Croci) (1,976 m)
 Monte Cornetto (1,899 m)
 Monte Priaforà (1,659 m)
 Monte Summano (1,296 m)

References

External links 

 
Mountain ranges of the Alps
Mountain ranges of Italy
Landforms of Veneto
Mountain ranges of Trentino
Southern Limestone Alps